WLWE (1360 AM, "Eagle Sports 1360") is a radio station licensed to serve Roanoke, Alabama.  The station is owned by Eagle's Nest, Inc.  It airs a sports format.

The station began broadcasting on March 10, 1950, and held the call sign WELR. It ran 1,000 watts during daytime hours only. Its call sign was changed to the current WLWE on September 16, 2013.

References

External links
WLWE official website

LWE
CBS Sports Radio stations
Randolph County, Alabama
Radio stations established in 1950
1950 establishments in Alabama